OptimFROG is a proprietary lossless audio data compression codec developed by Florin Ghido. OptimFROG is optimized for very high compression (small file sizes) at the expense of encoding and decoding speed, and consistently measures among the highest compressing lossless codecs. OptimFROG comes with three compressors: one lossless codec for integer LPCM format WAVE files, one for IEEE_754 floating-point WAVE files, and a DualStream format with a lossy part and a correction file for losslessness.

OptimFROG DualStream
OptimFROG DualStream is a lossy codec, aimed to fill the gap between perceptual coding and lossless coding as OptimFROG DualStream has an option to produce a correction file. This file can be used, in combination with the main lossy-encoded file, for lossless decoding, but not, unlike Wavpack hybrid for instance, for playback.

This correction feature is also offered by MPEG-4 SLS and DTS-HD Master Audio.

Technical details

Metadata
The OptimFROG file formats use APEv2 tags to store the metadata.  ID3 is also possible.

References

External links

OptimFROG at Hydrogenaudio Wiki.
OptimFROG at the Multimedia Wiki.

Lossless audio codecs